Zahau may refer to:

Zahab-e Olya, village in Nehbandan County, South Khorasan Province, Iran
Cheery Zahau (born 1981), Burmese human rights activist
Rebecca Zahau (1979–2011), Burmese-American woman